Sinobdella sinensis is an East Asian species of the spiny eel family of the order Synbranchiformes. It is the only species in the genus Sinobdella according to FishBase, but another species, S. dienbienensis, is placed there by Catalog of Fishes (that species in Mastacembelus by FishBase).

The placement of this genus has been debated. It is placed in Mastacembelidae as the sister group to the rest of the family. This species has been placed as a member of the family Chaudhuriidae, but the evidence for this relationship is not strong.

This fish is a subtropical species found in rivers in China, Taiwan, and Vietnam. It can grow to  TL. It inhabits rivers, feeding on larvae, insects, worms and crustaceans.

References

Mastacembelidae
Monotypic fish genera
Freshwater fish of China
Freshwater fish of Taiwan
Fish of Vietnam
Fish described in 1870